Jeffrey Truchon-Viel (born January 28, 1997) is a Canadian professional ice hockey forward currently playing for the San Jose Barracuda in the American Hockey League (AHL) while under contract to the San Jose Sharks in the National Hockey League (NHL)

Early life
Viel was born on January 28, 1997, in Rimouski, Quebec, Canada.

Playing career

Amateur
Growing up in Quebec, Viel played Midget AAA ice hockey with the Gauls from Collège Antoine-Girouard alongside Anthony Beauvillier. As a result of his physical style of play, he finished his rookie campaign on the team's second line and was drafted in the fourth round of the 2013 Quebec Major Junior Hockey League (QMJHL) Draft by the Sherbrooke Phoenix. Upon entering the league, Viel admitted to being "immature" and not maintaining healthy eating habits.

Following his rookie season, Viel was traded to the Acadie–Bathurst Titan in the summer of 2014, where he remained for the remainder of his major junior career. He made his debut with the team during the first week of the 2014–15 regular season against the Cape Breton Screaming Eagles, where he also scored his first goal of the season. In his first season with the Titans, Viel was the second-leading scorer on the team with 45 points although they finished 19 points out from a playoff spot. 

Near the beginning of the 2017–18 season, Viel received his first suspension of the season after charging an opponent during a game. On February 20, 2018, Viel was suspended four games for shoulder-checking an opponent in the head during a game against the Cape Breton Screaming Eagles. In spite of his suspension, Viel helped the team win the President's Cup as the QMJHL's Champions and earn the Guy Lafleur Trophy as the tournament's most valuable player. During Game 1 of the semi-final round of the 2018 Memorial Cup, Viel two goals and assisted on two more as the Titan beat the Victoriaville Tigres 6–3. He continued to assist the team is scoring and entered Game 3 of the Memorial Cup finals with 23 points across 20 post-season games. During Game 3, Viel scored one goal to help lift the Titan to their first Memorial Cup in franchise history. As a result of his successful season, Viel was also named to the tournament's All-Star Team.

Professional
Following his Memorial Cup win, Viel joined the San Jose Barracuda, the American Hockey League (AHL) affiliate of the San Jose Sharks. In his first season with the team, he recorded 22 points, 94 penalty minutes, and 116 shots on goal. As a result, he was signed to a two-year, two-way contract with the Sharks on May 29, 2019. 

In the pandemic delayed 2020–21 season, Viel made his NHL debut with the Sharks against the Minnesota Wild on March 29, 2021. In his first NHL shift, he recorded his first fight against Luke Johnson, finishing scoreless in a 4–3 shootout victory. During the 2021 offseason, Viel signed a two-year extension to remain with the Sharks. He scored his first NHL goal on December 28, 2021, in 8–7 shootout victory over the Arizona Coyotes.

Career statistics

Awards and honours

References

External links

1997 births
Living people
Acadie–Bathurst Titan players
Canadian expatriate ice hockey players in the United States
Canadian ice hockey right wingers
Ice hockey people from Quebec
People from Rimouski
San Jose Barracuda players
San Jose Sharks players
Sherbrooke Phoenix players
Undrafted National Hockey League players